Carnatic most often refers to:
Carnatic region, Southern India
Carnatic music, the classical music of Southern India

Carnatic may also refer to:
Carnatic Wars, a series of military conflicts in India during the 18th century
, a Bangor-class minesweeper of the Royal Indian Navy, that served in World War II
, a 74-gun third rate ship of the line of the Royal Navy, launched at Deptford in 1783
, a 74-gun third rate ship of the line of the Royal Navy, launched at Portsmouth Dockyard in 1823
, one of several vessels of that name
Carnatic Hall, built by slave trader, now closed university residence

ca:Carnàtic